Stillingfleet is a village and civil parish in the Selby district of North Yorkshire, England. It was historically part of the East Riding of Yorkshire until 1974.

Stillingfleet was once the site of UK Coal's Stillingfleet Mine, part of the Selby Coalfield, which closed in 2004.

The parish church of St Helen's is a grade I listed building.

Toponymy
The origin of the name 'Stillingfleet' lies in Old English. The village was recorded as Steflingefled in the Domesday Book of 1086.

1833 drowning
On Boxing Day 1833, 11 members of a party of carol singers from Stillingfleet were drowned when their boat overturned in the nearby River Ouse.

References

External links

Civil parishes in North Yorkshire
Selby District
Villages in North Yorkshire